Proriv (in Russian: Прорыв, “Breakthrough”) is a pro-Russian Eurasianist international youth organization which has branches in the non-recognized countries of Transnistria (where is recognized as an official party and can field candidates for elections to the Supreme Soviet), South Ossetia, Abkhazia and in Crimea in Ukraine.

Proriv activist took part in the June 2006 anti-NATO protests in Feodosiya; Proriv leader Alexei Dobychin was deported from Ukraine 21 June 2006.

See also
 Proriv (Transnistria)
 Politics of Transnistria

References

Eurasianism
Political parties in Transnistria
Youth organizations based in Transnistria